

Zëss (also known as Zëss: Le Jour du Néant) is the fourteenth studio album by the French rock band Magma, which was released on 14 June 2019 on Christian Vander's Seventh Records.

The composition dates back to the 1970s and has been performed live on several occasions (including Bobino Concert 1981, Les Voix Concert 1992, and Mythes Et Legendes Volume IV 2008) but never recorded in studio until 2018.

The work was performed live in the Grande Salle Pierre Boulez of Philharmonie de Paris on 26 June 2019, celebrating 50 years of Magma.

Track listing

Personnel

 Christian Vander - lead vocals
 Stella Vander - lead vocals
 Hervé Aknin - vocals
 Isabelle Feuillebois - vocals
 Julie Vander - vocals
 Laura Guarrato - vocals
 Marcus Linon - vocals
 Sandrine Destafanis - vocals
 Rudy Blas - guitar
 Philippe Bussonnet - bass
 Morgan Ågren - drums
 Simon Goubert - piano
 Sylvie Fisichella - vocals
 Remi Dumoulin - orchestration
 City of Prague Philharmonic Orchestra - orchestra
 Adam Klemens - conductor
 Lucie Svehlova - concertmaster

References

External links
Making of Zëss

Magma (band) albums
Concept albums
2019 albums